Hatten is a municipality in Oldenburg, in Lower Saxony, Germany.

Activities
Tourism endeavours emphasise the recreational and sporting opportunities available in the area. This includes, adjoining Kirchhatten, a large recreational centre, with swimming pool, exhibition and other facilities. Many visitors enjoy canoeing on the region's major river, the Hunte. The Hatten Airfield, Flugplatz Oldenburg-Hatten, is suitable for small aircraft. It also comprises a flight training school, and sightseeing flights can be booked there as well.

The region is serviced through an extensive public transport system, connecting with regional centres, with regular bus and train (NordWestBahn) schedules. These provide access to prominent tourist attractions, which in Sandkrug includes Blacksmith and Printing Museums. Moreover, Sandhatten features the workshop of well-known European artist Martin McWilliam, as well as ca. 6000-year-old stone graves.

Hatter Sprudel (Spring Water) 
The name given to water attained from around the Osenberge, know to be one of the purest sources of spring water in all of Germany. It is entirely free of substantial bacteriological impurities, thus requiring the addition of no chlorine. Water from this source is sufficient to supply the needs of approximately 60 per cent of the greater Oldenburg area.

Municipal divisions
Hatten consists of the following divisions:
 Bümmerstede-Ost
 Dingstede
 Hatterwüsting 1 and 2
 Kirchhatten 1, 2 and 3
 Munderloh
 Sandhatten
 Sandkrug 1, 2 and 3
 Sandtange
 Schmede
 Streekermoor 1 and 2
 Tweelbäke-Ost

Neighbouring municipalities
 North-West: Oldenburg
 North-East: Hude
 East: Ganderkesee
 South: Dötlingen
 North-North-West: Großenkneten
 West: Wardenburg

Geography
 Overall land mass: 10,344 ha
 Economically utilised land mass: 6,946 ha
 Economically utilised land mass pertaining to agriculture: 6,115 ha
 Forested area: 2,550 ha
 Water bodies: 14 ha
 Residential and Farm buildings: 201 ha
 Moorland: 113 ha
 Miscellaneous remaining: 8 ha

History and heritage
Hatten, or its internal division of Kirchhatten, was first attributed the name of "Hatho" in 860 AD. Derived from the Germanic dialects of Hathus or Hadu, the word may be loosely interpreted to relate to "War", "God of War" or "Fortunate Warrior".

Tacks from hunters exist from the Stone Age, as well as those of later Germanic tribes and saxons. Settlements are known to have developed in the region partially as a result of abundance of fruitful agricultural lands.

Coat of arms
a) The dual fir trees may be regarded as an entrance; also, as a representation of the abundantly forested land
b) The centrally located shield is used to represent the historically-connected ownership of the area to the Oldenburger count
c) The stylised rose located in the upper portion is indicative of attributes of the land itself. Moreover, it may be traced to the oldest coat of arms of Oldenburg-Wildeshausen.

Sons and daughters 
 Peter Suhrkamp (1891-1959), German publisher

References

External links
 Hatten Gemeinde Website
 Bundesstaat Niedersachsen (Lower Saxony)

Oldenburg (district)